Hush is the second album by electro-pop group The Limousines.

Track listing

2013 albums
The Limousines albums